Coming Soon is a 1982 American direct-to-video documentary film directed by John Landis for Universal Pictures. Landis used trailers of old Universal horror and thriller films to create his own contribution to his favorite film genres. The film is narrated by Jamie Lee Curtis.

Production
Jamie Lee Curtis's scenes were filmed at Dracula's Castle, European Street, and the Psycho House on the backlot of Universal Studios in Universal City, California.

Featured clips

The Hunchback of Notre Dame (1923)
The Phantom of the Opera (1925)
Frankenstein (1931)
Dracula (1931)
The Mummy (1932)
The Bride of Frankenstein (1935)
The Mummy's Hand (1940)
The Wolf Man (1941)
Dr. Jekyll and Mr. Hyde (1941)
Invisible Agent (1942)
The Mummy's Tomb (1942)
Captive Wild Woman (1943)
Son of Dracula (1943)
Weird Woman (1944)
The Mummy's Ghost (1944)
The Mummy's Curse (1944)
House of Frankenstein (1944)
House of Dracula (1945)
Abbott and Costello Meet Frankenstein (1948)
Abbott and Costello Meet Dr. Jekyll and Mr. Hyde (1953)
Creature from the Black Lagoon (1954)
Revenge of the Creature (1955)
Tarantula (1955)
This Island Earth (1955)
Curucu, Beast of the Amazon (1956)
The Mole People (1956)
The Creature Walks Among Us (1956)
The Deadly Mantis (1957)
The Incredible Shrinking Man (1957)
Psycho (1960)
Brides of Dracula (1960)
King Kong vs. Godzilla (1962)
The Birds (1963)
The Night Walker (1964)

References

External links

American documentary films
1982 direct-to-video films
1982 documentary films
American direct-to-video films
Films directed by John Landis
Documentary films about films
Documentary films about horror
Direct-to-video documentary films
Universal Pictures direct-to-video films
Films with screenplays by John Landis
Films with screenplays by Mick Garris
Films produced by John Landis
Films produced by Mick Garris
1980s English-language films